Kralovice is a town in Plzeň-North District in the Plzeň Region of the Czech Republic. It has about 3,400 inhabitants. It is known for the former pilgrimage site of Mariánská Týnice.

Administrative parts
Villages of Bukovina, Hradecko, Mariánský Týnec, Řemešín and Trojany are administrative parts of Kralovice.

Geography
The southern part of the municipal territory with the town proper lies in the Plasy Uplands. The northern part lies in the Rakovník Uplands. The Kralovický Stream flows through the town. There are several small ponds around the town.

History
The first written mention of Kralovice is from 1183, when Duke Frederick donated it to the Plasy Monastery. In 1547, Kralovice gained coat of arms and became a town.

Until 1918, the town was part of the Austria-Hungary (Austrian part after the compromise of 1867), head of  the Kralowitz – Kralovice district, one of the 94 Bezirkshauptmannschaften in Bohemia.

Demographics

Sights
The landmark of Kralovice is the Church of Saints Peter and Paul. The originally Gothic church from the mid-14th century was rebuilt in the late Renaissance style in 1575–1581. Its chapel dates from 1868.

The village of Mariánský Týnec is known for the former pilgrimage site of Mariánská Týnice. It is a Baroque complex formed by a monastery and the Church of the Annunciation. Today the monastery houses the Museum and Gallery of the Northern Plzeň Region.

Notable people
Isa Grégrová (1878–1962), actress
Marie Uchytilová (1924–1989), sculptor

References

External links

Cities and towns in the Czech Republic
Populated places in Plzeň-North District